The 4th Yerevan Golden Apricot International Film Festival was a film festival held in Yerevan, Armenia from 9–14 July 2007. More than 120 films from around the world were presented during the festival with attendance from contemporary filmmakers such as Bruno Dumont, Leos Carax, Carla Garapedian, Lee Chang-dong, Andrey Zvyagintsev, Aurora Quattrocchi and Tchéky Karyo. Paolo and Vittorio Taviani (Italy), directors of The Lark Farm (Opening Film of the Festival) were honored with Lifetime Achievement Awards. The international juries, headed by An Cheong-sook (South Korea), Martin Schweighofer (Austria), Vigen Chaldranyan (Armenia) awarded the following prizes: Golden Apricot 2007 for the Best Feature Film to Ulrich Seidl for his film Import/Export (Austria); Golden Apricot 2007 for the Best Documentary Film to Vardan Hovhannisyan for his film A Story of People in War and Peace (Armenia) and Golden Apricot 2007 for the Best Film in the “Armenian Panorama” to Screamers by Carla Garapedian (UK). Vardan Hovhannisyan (A Story of People in War and Peace) was awarded with the FIPRESCI and Ecumenical Jury Prizes and Carla Garapedian (Screamers) was also awarded the Ecumenical Jury Price.

About the Golden Apricot Yerevan International Film Festival 
The Golden Apricot Yerevan International Film Festival (GAIFF) is an annual film festival held in Yerevan, Armenia. The festival was founded in 2004 with the co-operation of the “Golden Apricot” Fund for Cinema Development, the Armenian Association of Film Critics and Cinema Journalists. The GAIFF is continually supported by the Ministry of Foreign Affairs of the RA, the Ministry of Culture of the RA and the Benevolent Fund for Cultural Development.The objectives of the festival are "to present new works by the film directors and producers in Armenia and foreign cinematographers of Armenian descent and to promote creativity and originality in the area of cinema and video art".

Awards GAIFF 2007

See also 
 Golden Apricot Yerevan International Film Festival
 Atom Egoyan
 Serge Avedikian
 Bruno Dumont
 Leos Carax
 Carla Garapedian
 Lee Chang-dong
 Andrey Zvyagintsev
 Vardan Hovhannisyan
 Cinema of Armenia
 2007 in film

References

Yerevan International Film Festival
21st century in Yerevan
2007 in Armenia
2007 film festivals
2007 festivals in Asia
2007 festivals in Europe